Nicole Meylan-Levecque (born 6 November 1963) is a Swiss sailor. She competed at the 1992 Summer Olympics and 1996 Summer Olympics.

References

1963 births
Living people
Sportspeople from Geneva
Swiss female sailors (sport)
Olympic sailors of Switzerland
Sailors at the 1992 Summer Olympics – Europe
Sailors at the 1996 Summer Olympics – Europe